Apioninae is a subfamily of pear-shaped weevils in the family of beetles known as Brentidae. There are at least 20 genera and 80 described species in Apioninae.

Genera
These 22 genera belong to the subfamily Apioninae:

 Alocentron Schilsky in Kuester, 1901 g b
 Apion Herbst, 1797 i b
 Apionion Kissinger, 1998 g b
 Aspidapion g b
 Betulapion Ehret, 1994 g b
 Chrysapion Kissinger, 1968 b
 Coelocephalapion Wagner, 1914 g b
 Eutrichapion Reitter, 1916 g b
 Exapion Bedel, 1887 i g b
 Fallapion Kissinger, 1968 g b
 Ischnopterapion g b
 Kissingeria Alonso-Zarazaga, 1991 g b
 Loborhynchapion Gyorffy, 1956 g b
 Neapion Alonso-Zarazaga, 1991 g b
 Neotropion b
 Omphalapion Schilsky, 1901 g b
 Perapion Wagner, 1907 i g b
 Podapion Riley, 1883 g b
 Rhopalapion Schilsky, 1906 g b
 Sayapion Kissinger, 1999 g b
 Stenopterapion Bokor, 1923 g b
 Trichapion Wagner, 1912 g b

Data sources: i = ITIS, c = Catalogue of Life, g = GBIF, b = Bugguide.net

References

Further reading

External links

 

Brentidae